The Tala tank, also spelled Tallah tank, is a water tower in Kolkata, West Bengal, India. Construction started in 1909 and it was inaugurated in May 1911 by Edward Norman Baker, the Lieutenant Governor of Bengal. The tank, which is owned by Kolkata Municipal Corporation, is fed by Palta Water Works near Barrackpore. More than 110 years after construction, the tower remains the major water supplier to the city of Kolkata.

The tank has four individually isolated chambers and a single pipeline for source from Palta and supply to the city. The steel was imported from the United Kingdom and is of similar quality to that which was used to build the RMS Titanic. It has survived multiple calamities including the 1934 Nepal–India earthquake, World War II Imperial Japanese aerial bombings from 1942 to 1944 and Cyclone Amphan in 2020.

History 

Before pumped water supply to Kolkata began in 1820, the city's water was mainly sourced from the Lal Dighi at B. B. D. Bagh, which the British authorities considered was the only hygienic water body in the area. In 1820, as demand for water grew, a small pump house was built at Chandpal Ghat to draw water from the Hooghly River. The supply reached the city via Tala and the first pipeline was installed in 1868.

Initially, Palta Water Works fed an underground reservoir at Wellington Square (now Subodh Chandra Mallick Square) in the city centre. Supply from underground reservoirs proved to be challenging in terms of cost and time, and because of the very flat landscape in and around the city there was no suitable place to build a high reservoir. To ensure uninterrupted water supply to the city, the Assistant Engineer of Calcutta Corporation (now Kolkata Municipal Corporation or KMC), Arthur Peirce, conceived what became Tala tank in 1901. The Chief Engineer of KMC, W. B. MacCabe, designed the tank in 1902. Having a nine-million-gallon water reservoir overhead was a daring proposition. Edward Norman Baker, Lieutenant Governor of Bengal, commissioned the tank on 18 November 1909.

Philanthropist Babu Khelat Ghosh donated around 7 bigha [] of land for the construction. The lane adjoining the tank was later named Khelat Babu Lane. M/s T K Mukherjee and Co. did the piling work. The foundation of reinforced concrete was built by Rajendra Nath Mookerjee's company M/s Martin and Co. It was heavily ballasted and compressed using steamrollers. Raw materials, wood and special anti-corrosive steel plates were brought from Burma (now Myanmar) and Middlesbrough, England, respectively, and fabrication works were carried out on-site. M/s Clayton, Son and Co. of Leeds, England carried out the work of fabricating and erecting the steel columns and tank. The top cover was provided by Arracon Co. and Babu Kali Sunkar Mitter. With new main pipelines and installations, the total cost of the tank was around US$1.55 million in 1911 (equivalent to $ million in ).

Connections from Palta waterworks to the Tala tank were made with  diameter cast iron pipes that were laid along Barrackpore Trunk Road. The tank was designed to work as a water reserve for the main lines in the city. It connected the Wellington Square reservoir via Circular Road and Dhurramtollah (now Dharmatala).

Threats
The tank has survived several calamities since construction. In 1934, it survived the 8.0 magnitude Nepal–India earthquake. Another potential threat to the reservoir was the 2020 Cyclone Amphan, a Super Cyclonic Storm and one of the strongest storms to impact the area, since the 1999 Odisha cyclone. KMC and Jadavpur University (JU) experts and engineers assessed the risk and devised a precautionary plan to save the tank from toppling. They suggested half-filling all four of the tank's chambers until the cyclone had passed and cutting the water supply from the reservoir to maintain the weight balance against high-velocity winds and gusts, because the tank is supported by columns with no anchorage. The super cyclone did not damage the reservoir.

During the Second World War, the reservoir, along with the Howrah Bridge and Kolkata Port, was under constant threat of Japanese aerial bombings on Calcutta. The British were worried about this because it was the city's biggest reservoir. To prevent it from being bombed, it is said that grass was planted on top of the tank so it resembled an open field from above. Tala tank also endured bomb scares during the India-Pakistan Wars of 1947–1948 and 1965. At the time of the 1964 East Pakistan riots rumours spread that the tank had been poisoned by the Muslims. Out of fear, people in the city started carrying soda bottles, instead of water. A poison scare resurfaced in February 2011, when then Railway Minister Mamata Banerjee alleged that CPM party men might add poison to the tank and Palta waterworks. Central Industrial Security Force personnel were assigned to guard the tank as a security measure.

Renovation 
During Tala Tank's centenary in 2009, minor renovations were carried out. The first major overhaul was planned in 2013 with 2020 as the deadline after an assessment by IIEST Shibpur, JU, IIT Kharagpur and Central Electrochemical Research Institute experts that showed the tank's condition was deteriorating and that it needed an immediate overhaul. Signs of steel corrosion were evident at multiple areas of the chambers. Up to 2020, the reservoir had developed fourteen leaks. Vegetation had started to grow on the wooden sleepers and the sleepers had shifted from the original position. The work was delayed multiple times, mainly due to lack of funds. The Government of India  bore 33% of the cost and the rest was borne by the Government of West Bengal and KMC. Bridge and Roof Company was engaged to perform the overhaul. To compensate for the shortage of water during the renovation, existing pumps across the city's water network were upgraded and extra pumps were installed at Palta. In 2017, KMC installed a leak detection system in the tank. The first chamber renovation was completed and was opened on 19 June 2019 by the Mayor of Kolkata, Firhad Hakim. As of May 2021, the deadline for completion of the renovation work was October that year.

The upgrade to  diameter pipeline system was completed in 2012 and cost .

Structure

Tala Tank is claimed to be the largest overhead reservoir in the world was constructed on the 250-year-old Barrackpore Trunk Road. It is made of Burmese teak wood and steel of the same quality that was used in RMS Titanic. Because the soil's bearing capacity is limited due to silt below Kolkata, the tank was built upon a  monolithic concrete bed weighing 26 thousand tonnes. The structure's piling uses  logs. The 288–295,  columns, which are embedded on a plinth that supports the tank, are made of galvanised steel. The bottom of the reservoir rests on wooden sleepers above the columns with no bolts or welding. The columns are braced in groups of four but no groups are inter-braced to provide flexibility to the structure and prevent it from vibrating. It has American roofing material that helps keep the water cool and clean. The eaves are covered with brass gauze to deny access to birds and insects.The tank is unique; it acts as a balancer. Having a single  diameter mild steel water source and a supply pipe that fills the tank during off-peak hours and stores water in four equally sized, isolated chambers and supplies it to the city and other major underground reservoirs according to demand. The water pressure from Tala assists the pumps to fulfil the main line's demand. The chambers were made independent by cross frames to individually facilitate maintenance in each chamber without hampering the water supply. It weighs 36 thousand tonnes empty and 48.5 thousand tonnes when full. The whole tank with the support weighs 44 thousand tonnes while the steel components weigh 8,500 t. Tala Tank can store enough water to satisfy the needs of Kolkata and the adjacent residential-cum-business district Salt Lake City for two days.

See also 
Water supply and sanitation in India

Note

References

External links 

 Kolkata Municipal Corporation: water supply

Water towers in India
Buildings and structures in Kolkata
Towers completed in 1911
1911 establishments in India
20th-century architecture in India